Hasted Hunt was a contemporary art gallery located in Chelsea, New York City at 537 West 24th Street. The gallery was founded in 2005 by founding partner Sarah Hasted and W.M. Hunt. Hasted Hunt Gallery represented emerging and established artists from around the world. The addition of two painters and a sculptor to Hasted Hunt's repertoire in 2011–2012 had marked a progressive turning point to expand the gallery's program from a former focus on contemporary and vintage photography.

The gallery arranged and facilitated museum exhibitions for their artists and places the work in such institutions as the Brooklyn Museum, Museum of Modern Art, Metropolitan Museum of Art, Margulies Collection, Victoria & Albert Museum, Museum of Fine Arts in Houston, Museum of Fine Arts in Boston, Los Angeles County Museum of Art, National Gallery of Canada and The Smithsonian's National Portrait Gallery.

Represented artists 
 Michael Benson
 Nick Brandt
 Jean-Paul Goude
 Nathan Harger
 Erwin Olaf
 Martin Schoeller
 Albert Watson

Exhibitions 
 November 8, 2013 through January 4, 2014 - An Artist, A Curator And A Rabbi Walk Into A Bar..., Marc Dennis
 September 5 through November 1, 2013 - Across the Ravaged Land, Nick Brandt
 July 9 through August 15, 2013 - Great Photographs of the 20th Century / Sketchy
 May 2 through June 21, 2013 - The Infinite City, Paolo Ventura
 March 14 through April 26, 2013 - Berlin, Erwin Olaf
 January 24 through March 8, 2013 - Planetfall, Michael Benson
 December 4, 2012 through January 19, 2013 - Vintage Photographs Celebrating the 20th Anniversary of Cyclops, Albert Watson
 September 6 through October 20, 2012 - Kwang Young Chun, Kwang Young Chun
 June 14 through July 20, 2012 - Great Photographs: Scape & Awol Erizku
 March 29 through June 8, 2012 - On This Earth, A Shadow Falls, Nick Brandt
 February 9 through March 24, 2012 - Kim Dong Yoo, Kim Dong Yoo
 December 8, 2011 through February 4, 2012 - Relatos, Pierre Gonnord
 October 20 through December 3, 2011 - Honey Bunny, Marc Dennis
 September 8 through October 15, 2011 - The Automaton of Venice, Paolo Ventura
 July 7 through August 18, 2011 - Don't Quit Your Day Job  and  Tulips, Julian Faulhaber
 May 19 through July 1, 2011 - Great Photographs From The 20th Century: From The Street
 March 31 through May 14, 2011 - The Japan Series, Andreas Gefeller
 February 3 through March 26, 2011 - Beyond, Michael Benson
 December 9, 2010 through January 29, 2011 - Nathan Harger, Nathan Harger
 October 21 through December 4, 2010 -  Albert Watson, Albert Watson
 September 9 through October 16, 2010 - Lucifer Falls, Jeff Bark and Pentimento, Edward Burtynsky
 July 1 through August 20, 2010 - Female Bodybuilders, Martin Scholler
 May 6 through June 26, 2010 - Lowdensitypolyethylene II, Julian Faulhaber
 March 25 through May 1, 2010 - Great Photographs From The 20th Century: Staged And Startled
 January 28 through March 30, 2010 - Hotel, Dawn & Dusk, Erwin Olaf
 December 10, 2009 through January 23, 2010 - Winter Stories, Paolo Ventura
 October 6 through November 28, 2009 - Oil, Edward Burtynsky
 May 21 through August 28, 2009 - True Color, New York Photographs... The Statue Of Liberty
 March 5 through May 16, 2009 - Andreas Gefeller
 January 8 through February 28, 2009 - Contradictions In Black & White

2005 establishments in New York City
Art galleries established in 2005
Chelsea, Manhattan